Ximena Armas (born 29 July 1946 in Santiago, Chile) is a Chilean painter.

Biography
Ximena Armas Fernández first attended the Escuela de Bellas Artes at the Universidad de Chile, then the Escuela de Artes at the Universidad Católica de Chile in Santiago, where she was trained by Mario Carreño, Eduardo Vilches, and Mario Toral. Upon her arrival in France in 1971, she attended the École nationale supérieure des arts décoratifs and the École nationale supérieure des Beaux-Arts in Paris. She lives in Paris, and is married to the French painter Henri Richelet.

Since 1969, she has participated in numerous group and solo exhibitions in Chile, France, Spain, and Mexico.

Ximena Armas's works hide secrets. Nothing is revealed; all is instead veiled with ribbons and bands, hemmed with curtains, burrowed beneath a mass of stones. She fringes all her paintings with mystery, dresses them with shades. One is struck at once by their odd composition, made of striped bands, ruffled feathers, or beach huts. Her figures hide or suddenly appear as shadows or silhouettes. The artist plays at staging over and over again the familiar elements of her dreamlike world, thus totally mastering space and swamping it with symbols.

Solo exhibitions

 1969 : Galería Arturo Edwards, Santiago, Chile.
 1970 : Galería C.C. Providencia, Santiago, Chile.
 1980 : Galerie La Bolée, Anonnay, France.
 1982 : Latino-Américains à Paris, Grand Palais, Paris.
 1986 : Galerie Lefor Openo, Saint-Cloud, France.
 1987 :
 Espace latino-américain, Paris.
 Galerie de la Main de fer, Perpignan, France.
 1990 :
 Galería La Fachada, Santiago, Chile.
 Galerie Ceibo, Paris.
 1996 : Hôtel de Ville, Neufchâteau, France.
 1999 : Galería Arte Actual, Santiago, Chile.
 2001 : Museo Nacional de Bellas Artes, Santiago, Chile.
 2003 : Musée Roybet-Fould, Courbevoie, France.
 2006 :
 Galería Modigliani, Viña del Mar, Chile.
 Galería Praxis, Santiago, Chile.
 2007–2008 : Le Trait d’Union, Neufchâteau, France.

Main group exhibitions

 1969 : Prix Crav de Peinture, Museo de Arte Contemporáneo, Santiago, Chile.
 1972 : La Peinture chilienne, UNESCO, Paris.
 1974 : Grafic 74, Museo de Arte Contemporáneo, Ibiza, Espagne.
 1981 :
 Art pour le Nicaragua, Musée d’Art Moderne, Paris.
 Cent gravures contemporaines
 1982 : Chili Vivant, Mexico.
 1983 : Chili-femmes, Espace latino-américain, Paris.
 1984 : Peintres latino-américains, Monaco.
 1986 : Les Figurations de 1960 à nos jours, Musée de Cagnes-sur-Mer, E.B.A. de Besançon, Musée de Carcassonne, Couvent des Cordeliers de Châteauroux, France.
 1989 : Musée de l'Amérique latine, Monaco.
 1990 : Art chilien d’aujourd’hui, Espace Belleville and UNESCO, Paris.
 1991 : Festival international de la peinture, Château-musée de Cagnes-sur-Mer, France.
 1995 :
 Femmes ibéro-américaines, Junta de Extramadura, Caceres, Espagne.
 Présence du Chili en France, Galería Plastica Nueva, Santiago, Chile.
 1996 : Artistes Chiliens en France, Museo de Arte Contemporáneo, Santiago, Chile.
 1997 :
 Festival des arts 1997 – Dialogue Est-Ouest, Vayolles, Vienne, France.
 Persistance du paysage dans la peinture chilienne, Museo de Arte Contemporáneo, Santiago, Chile.
 2003 : Hommage à S. Allende, Centre culturel Robert-Desnos, Ris-Orangis, France.
 2004 : Georges Sand, interprétations, Couvent des Cordeliers, Châteauroux, France.
 2007 : Santiago Paris Santiago, Galería La Ventana Cemicual, Santiago, Chile.

Bibliography

References

External links

Artistas Plásticos Chilenos@Ximena Armas

  Site officiel de Ximena Armas
  Sitio official de Ximena Armas
  Recent paintings

1946 births
Living people
20th-century Chilean painters
21st-century Chilean painters
20th-century Chilean women artists
21st-century Chilean women artists
École des Beaux-Arts alumni
Artists from Santiago
École nationale supérieure des arts décoratifs alumni
Chilean women painters